Brightwalton Green is a hamlet in the civil parish of Brightwalton in the county of Berkshire, England.

References

Hamlets in Berkshire
Brightwalton